The Arena is a debate-style television show produced by Mediacorp Channel 5 in Singapore. Season 1 of the show was broadcast from January–March 2007. A second season, known as The Arena II, was aired from March–May 2008. The show involves teams of students from secondary schools in Singapore debating against each other on issues of topical interest.

Season 1 of the show was won by the team from the United World College of South East Asia, who defeated Hwa Chong Institution in the final. The season was hosted by the popular Singapore TV personality Adrian Pang.

For The Arena II, Jason Chan replaced Adrian Pang as the show's host. The season was won by Raffles Institution, who defeated Nanyang Girls' High School in the final.

The Arena was one of the four nominees for the 2007 International Emmy Award in the 'Children and Young People' category, alongside shows from Australia, Brazil and Poland. (The winning show in the category was The Magic Tree from Poland.)
The Arena was also one of six nominees for the 'Best Game or Quiz Programme' at the 2008 Asian Television Awards.

The Arena Season 1 

Season 1 of The Arena was broadcast from January–March 2007, and ran for 11 episodes. In each episode, teams from two secondary schools in Singapore debated against each other. The topic for debate was different for each episode. Ten schools competed in the first round, from which the five winning teams and the best-scoring losing team progressed to the quarter-finals. The semi-finals were contested by the three winners and the best-scoring losing team from the quarter-finals. In the Grand Final, telecast on 27 March 2007, the team from the United World College of South East Asia defeated the team from Hwa Chong Institution to win the competition. Each episode was hosted by Adrian Pang.

Progress of teams 

Ten schools qualified for the televised rounds of The Arena Season 1.

Note: In both Round One and the Quarter-Finals, the highest-scoring losing team also advanced to the next round as a 'Wildcard'.

Topics and results for each episode

Debate format 
The format of debates for The Arena Season 1 was created specially for the show and differed from other competitive debate formats.

Each team had three speakers. The first speaker on each team spoke for 3 minutes and 30 seconds, the second speaker for 4 minutes, and the third speaker for 4 minutes and 30 seconds. Each set of two speeches was considered to be one 'Round' within the debate, and each 'Round' was judged separately. Speakers stood in the middle of the room, and spoke directly to one opponent from the other team (rather than facing to the audience and the judges as in most other debate formats). This opponent was allowed interrupt the speech with points of information (POIs – a feature of both the World Schools style and British Parliamentary style of debating). However unlike other debate formats which use POIs, the speaker is not allowed to decline to hear a point when it was offered by the opposing speaker. Each team had a 1-minute and 30 second POI 'Rebuttal Bank', which they could use over the course of the three speeches by the other team. In between the second and third speeches of the two teams, there was an additional 3-minute 'Group Rebuttal Round' involving all 6 debaters in a series of short arguments and immediate responses on the topic.

Each episode was judged by four judges. Each judge decided which team they thought has won each 'Round' within the debate, and the team with the most points at the end was declared the winner.

Judges 

Each episode was judged by three regular judges and one guest judge. The regular judges on the show were:

 K.K. Seet – Senior Lecturer at the National University of Singapore 
 Eunice Olsen – Nominated Member of Parliament and former Miss Singapore Universe 
 Ashraf Safdar – Journalist from the Today newspaper and member of the Debate Association Singapore Executive Committee

Guest judges for the show included Singapore celebrities like Tan Kheng Hua and Daisy Irani, and Gaurav Keerthi, who was also from the Debate Association. The guest judge for the final (and the only guest judge to appear on the show twice) was Viswa Sadasivan, the Chairman of the Political Development Feedback Group of Singapore's Feedback Unit, who is also the Chairman of the Right Angle Group and a former TV presenter.

For the preliminary selection rounds of the show (which were not televised), the teams were also judged by Geetha Creffield (ex-President of Debate Association Singapore and former coach of the Singapore national schools debating team) and Mark Gabriel (Secretary of the World Schools Debating Council and Tournament Director of the Singapore Secondary Schools Debating Championships).

Reaction and criticism

The show was generally well received by the public and the press, though some criticisms were also raised by the Singapore media.

One area of the show that came in for criticism was the debate topics, some of which were thought to be too one-sided. Shortly after the show began airing, 8 Days magazine criticised the topic used for the preliminary round match-up between Methodist Girls' School and CHIJ St. Nicholas Girls' School ('Selfish? Yes We Are! – Today's youth are motivated by self-centeredness alone'), saying that it was significantly easier for the team arguing against the topic (MGS – who won by a 72-28 scoreline).

The scoring system, which required judges to allocate all their points for each round to one team, even if they felt that team was only slightly better, also came in for criticism. The scoreline of the second semi-final between the United World College of South East Asia and Raffles Institution, which ended in a 94-6 victory for UWC, was particularly highlighted as being an unfair reflection on the closeness of the match-up.

The show concluded around the same time as a series of letters from members of the public were published in the Forum section of The Straits Times, discussing the relative merits of Singapore's education system and that of international schools in Singapore. A number of these letters made reference to UWC's success in the competition, some of them arguing that this was an indication that the school was better at producing students with stronger thinking skills and presentation ability than local schools, and others disputing this.

Emmy Award nomination 

The Arena was one of the four nominees for the 2007 International Emmy Award in the 'Children and Young People' category. The award was won by the Polish show The Magic Tree. The other two nominees in the category were Mortified (Australia) and Nutty Boy (Brazil).

The Arena II 

A second season of The Arena was broadcast from March–May 2008, and ran for 12 episodes. Jason Chan has replaced Adrian Pang as the host for season 2 of the show. The number of teams participating in the first round was increased to 12. There was no 'Wildcard' in the first round, but at the quarter-final stage the highest-scoring losing team gained a spot in the semi-finals. The Grand Final was telecast on 26 May 2008, and was won by Raffles Institution defeated who the team from Nanyang Girls' High School. An award was given for the Best Speaker of the Series, which went to Nicholas Quah of Raffles Institution.

Changes to the debate and judging format 

A new scoring system was introduced for The Arena II, with judges being able to allocate up to 20 points to each team for their performance in each round, plus an extra 'Team Strategy Score' of up to 20 points at the end of the debate. The number of judges was reduced to three judges per episode. The winning team was determined by the number of judges who awarded the win to each team (with the winning team claiming either a unanimous 3-0 decision or a 2-1 split decision).

The lengths of all speeches was also standardised at 4 minutes per speaker. The 'Group Rebuttal Round' was renamed the 'Quick-Fire Round', and remained 3 minutes long.

At the end of each episode, the judges selected one of the debaters as the best speaker of the debate.

Progress of teams 

12 schools were selected to participate in The Arena II following audition rounds in October–November 2007. (Defending-champions the United World College of South East Asia elected not to enter The Arena II as the planned recording dates coincided with their students' examinations.)

Note: The highest-scoring losing team in the Quarter-Finals advanced to the Semi-Finals as a 'Wildcard'.

Topics and results for each episode

Judges 

For season 2 of The Arena, the number of judges for each episode was reduced from four to three. K.K. Seet has returned from the first season as a permanent judge, joined by the President of Debate Association Singapore, Gaurav Keerthi. The third judge for each episode was a guest judge. Guest judges included Mark Gabriel and Adrian Tan. Viswa Sadasivan was again the guest judge for the Grand Final.

The preliminary selection rounds (which were not televised), were judged by Mark Gabriel, Geetha Creffield, Ashraf Safdar and Gaurav Keerthi.

Winning team 

The winning team for The Arena II came from Raffles Institution. Their team members were Adil Hakeem, Jarret Huang, Ashish Kumar and Nicholas Quah.

References

External links 
The Arena Official Website
MediaCorp discussion forum for The Arena II 
Debate Association Singapore - the external debate consultants for The Arena

Singaporean television series
Non-fiction television series
2007 Singaporean television series debuts
Channel 5 (Singapore) original programming